Magori is a nearly extinct Austronesian language of Papua New Guinea that has been strongly restructured through contact with neighboring Papuan languages, perhaps Mailu, which the Magori people speak fluently today. The restructuring was so extensive that Magori's family was long in doubt; it was finally established by Dutton in 1976. Magi in turn borrowed large numbers of Austronesian words, either from Magori or its extinct Oumic relatives.

See also
Maisin language, a similar case

References

Central Papuan Tip languages
Languages of Central Province (Papua New Guinea)
Endangered Austronesian languages
Mixed languages
Vulnerable languages